X Factor is a Franco-Belgian television music talent show to find new singing talent after public auditions, intermediate tests, and live shows. The first season was broadcast on Mondays, from September to December 2009, on W9 (France) and RTL-TVI (Belgium).

The second and final season was broadcast on Tuesdays, from March to June 2011, on M6 and RTL-TVI.

Series overview
 Contestant in "Alain Lanty" (over the age of 25)
 Contestant in "Julie Zenatti" (ages 16 to 24)
 Contestant in "Marc Cerrone" (groups)
 Contestant in "Henri Padovani" (groups)
 Contestant in "Oliver Schultheis" (girls)
 Contestant in "Christophe Willem" (over the age of 25)
 Contestant in "Véronic DiCaire" (boys)

Judges' categories and their contestants

In each season, each judge is allocated a category to mentor and chooses three acts to progress to the live shows. This table shows, for each season, which category each judge was allocated and which acts he or she put through to the live shows.

Key:
 – Winning judge/category. Winners are in bold, eliminated contestants in small font.

Season 1 (2009) 
The first season of the show aired from September to December 2009 and the winner was 26-year-old Sébastien Agius from the "Over 25" category. The judges were Alain Lanty, Julie Zenatti and Marc Cerrone.

Contestants 
The top 9 acts were confirmed as follows:

Key:
 – Winner
 – Runner up
 – Third Place

Results summary 

Color key:

Ratings

Season 2 (2011) 
Based on a generally good public reception, and after some speculations, X Factor came back for a second season in March 2011 on M6 (mother TV channel of W9), in place of Nouvelle Star, the French Pop Idol, programmed on M6 since 7 years after audience figures deteriorated for Star

Frédéric de Vincelles, general manager of W9, declared that even though all targeted goals were not attained in season 1, the program had still realised some respectable audience figures for the chain, making it the biggest grossing program for the network in 2009.

Differences with first season 
 First season was aired on a small TV channel with limited means. This is not the case with the second season, as the program tries to emulate the successful British edition.
 For this second season, M6 assigned 4 artists to be part of the jury: Christophe Willem, Véronic Dicaire, Olivier Schultheis and Henry Padovani. All judges are new and replace the old set of three judges Marc Cerrone, Alain Lanty and Julie Zenatti.
 Auditions were held in major French theatres, in public.
 The bootcamp lasted for days and included 3 events: vocal duels, choreography and solos on orchestra-band.
 Two to three French or international popstars are invited each week during liveshows .
 During shows, a second program, named "F@n Factor: Le Prime", is broadcast on the internet to show the backstage and see preparation of candidates and their reactions after singing. So, there isn't an after-show as Xtra Factor.
 Every day, a short program, named "F@n Factor: Le Mag", is broadcast on the internet to show repetitions of candidates with their coaches, and their daily activities.

Judges and hosts

For this second season, judges of the first season are not renewed. Also, for the first time, there are four judges (so four categories in competition) :
 Christophe Willem (27 years old) – French singer and songwriter. He sang in a gospel choir and won the fourth edition of Nouvelle Star (French version of Pop Idol) in 2006. He sold over 2 million albums and was nominated several times in NRJ Music Awards and Victoires de la Musique.
 Olivier Schultheis (45 years old) – French conductor, musician and songwriter. He discovered Christophe Maé and composed for Hélène Ségara, Thierry Amiel, Christophe Willem and for musicals (Le Roi Soleil, Mozart l'opéra rock...) and wrote soundtracks for films. He was also a producer of Nouvelle Star (French version of Pop Idol).
 Véronic DiCaire (34 years old) - Franco-Ontarian singer and imitator. She was discovered by Céline Dion and René Angélil and was renowned for her imitations of many voices including Céline Dion, Tina Turner, Lynda Lemay, Lara Fabian, Isabelle Boulay, Christina Aguilera, Cyndi Lauper, Vanessa Paradis and others. She released two albums (with her real performing voice) in 2002 and 2005.
 Henry Padovani (58 years old) – Corsican songwriter, guitarist and manager. He is the founding member of The Police with Stewart Copeland but Sting fired him in favour of Andy Summers. He was the director of IRS Records, where he promoted many groups such as R.E.M., The Fleshtones, The Cramps, and The Bangles. He was also the manager of Zucchero and I Muvrini.

To present the show, M6 selected Sandrine Corman for the liveshows and early stages and Jérôme Anthony for F@n Factor and early stages.

Chronology of the early stages

 Preselections:
 2 November 2010 in Nice, Lyon and Strasbourg
 4 November 2010 in Marseille, Lille and Clermont-Ferrand
 6 November 2010 in Montpellier, Rennes and Brussels (Belgium)
 8 November 2010 in Toulouse
 9–10 November 2010 in Paris
 Auditions:

 'Bootcamp' : 25-26-27–28 January 2011 in Palais des Sports (Paris).

Judges' Houses 
Top 24 acts were chosen with six in each of the four category. The judges added a 25th contestant in the Groups category making the contestants for the Groups seven instead of six. The newly created group was named "Seconde Nature" and included 5 candidates who had applied for the "Boys" category but had failed to qualify individually to the Top 24, but were deemed talented enough to be given a second chance by performing as part of a band in the Groups category.

Contestants 

Key:
 – Winner
 – Runner-Up
 – Third Place

Results summary
Colour key:

Ratings

References

External links 
 X Factor website (series 1) 
 X Factor website (series 2) 

2009 French television series debuts
French reality television series
French music television series
France
Television series by Fremantle (company)
2011 French television series endings
French television series based on British television series
RTL-TVI original programming